Shin Warsak is a community located in the South Waziristan District in Pakistan. It is known for a massacre that occurred in 2007, when 20 foreigners were killed in the community.

References 

Populated places in South Waziristan